Montpellier is a district of Cheltenham, Gloucestershire (England), at the end of the Promenade south of the town centre. Originally developed in the 1830s in conjunction with the spas, it is now known for its bars, cafés, restaurants and range of specialist shops. In April 2008 Montpellier was one of the most expensive areas in Cheltenham to buy property, with apartments ranging from £300,000 to over £1,000,000, townhouses from around £400,000, and houses over £4,000,000.

History
Montpellier Spa was initiated by Henry Thompson after springs were discovered on land he bought in 1801. The Spa buildings of 1817 were by George Allen Underwood. Thompson's son Pearson extensively developed the area and arranged for supporting entertainment for the spa facilities. He commissioned the distinctive Rotunda by John Buonarotti Papworth as a pump room in 1825. This was a branch of Lloyds Bank, but is now a part of The Ivy restaurant chain.  Opposite are "Montpellier Gardens", also laid out by Papworth. The architects and developers R. W. and C. Jearrad took over the running of Montpellier Spa from Thompson in 1830. Montpellier Walk, leading to Montpellier Spa and designed by W. H. Knight in 1840, is noted for the caryatids supporting the shop fronts.

Commercial activity
Montpellier is home to several clothing boutiques, three jeweller's shops, including Metal and Stone, a working goldsmiths, a Scandinavian specialist shop and also a varied selection of cafes. The Montpellier Courtyard is home to internationally recognised brands such as Bang & Olufsen and Tokyotattoo Studios. The unique tattoo & piercing studio opened its doors in 2012 on November 5. The tattoo studio won Independent Business of the Year in 2018.

Montpellier's bars include The Montpellier Wine Bar, The Rotunda Tavern, John Gordon's, Door 4 Cocktail Bar, Soho Bar and Eatery, Harry Cook and All Bar One, with The Circus Bar at the lower end of Montpellier Street. Eating establishments include The Thai Brasserie (Thai), Tarragon (Continental), Indian Voojan (Indian), and Strada (Italian and Mediterranean).

The area is connected with a Segregated Bicycle Path into Lansdown, Cheltenham.

References

 Verey, David (1976) Gloucestershire: the Vale and the Forest of Dean, (The Buildings of England), 2nd ed. Penguin Books

External links

Montpellier